Matteo Pinton (born 9 August 1998) is an Italian footballer who plays as a defender for  club Mantova.

Club career
He began his senior career with loans to Serie D clubs Mestre and Union Feltre.

On 5 July 2018, he joined Serie C club Virtus Verona on loan. He made his Serie C debut for Virtus Verona on 21 October 2018 in a game against Giana Erminio, as a 68th-minute substitute for Jacopo Rossi.

On 17 August 2020, he joined Mantova.

References

External links
 
 

1998 births
Living people
Sportspeople from Padua
Italian footballers
Association football defenders
Serie C players
Serie D players
Hellas Verona F.C. players
A.C. Mestre players
Virtus Verona players
Mantova 1911 players
Footballers from Veneto